Guru Dakshina is a 1983 Indian Malayalam-language film written and directed by Baby. It features Adoor Bhasi, Ratheesh, Mohanlal, Mammootty and Sathish Menon in major roles. The songs were composed by K. J. Joy. The film was a remake of Tamil film Engal Vathiyar (1980).

Plot

The story revolves around Kunjunni Mash, who is a school teacher. His daughter (Sunanada) falls in love with the Panchayat President's son (Sathish Menon). However, he demands dowry to Kunjunni Mash in the form of money to let the marriage happen. The rest of the movie shows how Kunjunni Mash goes to see each of his old students to seek help for his daughter's marriage.

Cast
 Adoor Bhasi as Kunjunni Mash
 Ratheesh as Inspector Majeet
 Mohanlal as Minister Prabhakaran
 Mammootty as John
 Sathish Menon 
 T. G. Ravi as Panchayat President
 Sukumari
 Kuthiravattam Pappu
 Sunanda
 C. I. Paul
 Anuradha 
 Santhakumari

Soundtrack
The music was composed by K. J. Joy and the lyrics were written by Poovachal Khader.

References

External links 
 

1983 films
Malayalam remakes of Tamil films
1980s Malayalam-language films
Films directed by Baby (director)